Appointee may refer to:

a member who is appointed to a position or office is called an appointee; in law, such a term is applied to one who is granted power of appointment of property
appointee, a foot soldier in the French army, who, for long service and bravery, received more pay than other privates. Such rank is still used in the Swiss Army
the third most lower rank of the Italian Corps of Carabineers
the third most lower rank of the Swiss Armed Forces
a person or organisation entrusted with managing the daily finances of vulnerable individuals
 An appointee is a term provided by the DWP to explain the role of an individual or corporate appointee that manages the finances of a vulnerable person that does not have the mental or physical ability to manage their daily money management tasks.

 DWP Cororate Appointee Page